The 2015–16 Czech National Football League is the 23rd season of the Czech Republic's second tier football league. The season starts on 1 August 2015.

Team changes

The number of teams in the Czech National Football League decreased from 16 to 15 for the 2015–16 season.

From FNL

 SK Sigma Olomouc (promoted to 2015–16 Czech First League)
 FC Fastav Zlín (promoted to 2015–16 Czech First League)
 FK Baník Most (relegated to 2015–16 Bohemian Football League)
 FK Kolín (relegated to 2015–16 Bohemian Football League)
 FK Viktoria Žižkov (relegated to 2015–16 Bohemian Football League) after being denied FNL licence for the 2015–16 season.

To FNL

 FC Hradec Králové (relegated from 2014–15 Czech First League)
 SK Dynamo České Budějovice (relegated from 2014–15 Czech First League)
 SK Sigma Olomouc B (promoted from 2014–15 Moravian–Silesian Football League)
 FK Slavoj Vyšehrad (promoted from 2014–15 Bohemian Football League)

Team overview

League table

See also
 2015–16 Czech First League
 2015–16 Czech Cup

References

2015–16 in Czech football
Czech National Football League seasons